The 1991–92 FIBA Korać Cup was the 21st edition of FIBA's Korać Cup basketball competition. The Italian Il Messaggero Roma defeated the Italian Scavolini Pesaro in the final. This was Il Messaggero Roma's second time winning the title after a victory in 1986 playing as Banco di Roma.

First round

|}

Second round

|}

Round of 16

Group A

Group B

Group C

Group D

Quarterfinals

|}

Semifinals

|}

Finals

|}

External links
 1991–92 FIBA Korać Cup @ linguasport.com

1991–92
1991–92 in European basketball